This is a list of members of the Victorian Legislative Council from the elections of 12 September 1901 to the elections of 11 September 1902.

From 1889 there were fourteen Provinces and a total of 48 members.

Note the "Term in Office" refers to that members term(s) in the Council, not necessarily for that Province.

Henry Wrixon was President of the Council; Frederick Brown was Chairman of Committees.

References

 Re-member (a database of all Victorian MPs since 1851).

Members of the Parliament of Victoria by term
20th-century Australian politicians